Acme Airport formerly  was an airport which was located  south of Acme, Alberta, Canada.

References

External links
Place to Fly on COPA's Places to Fly airport directory

Defunct airports in Alberta
Kneehill County